Wulfilopsis is a genus of South American anyphaenid sac spiders first described by B. A. M. Soares & Hélio Ferraz de Almeida Camargo in 1955.

Species
 it contains six species, all found in Brazil:
Wulfilopsis frenata (Keyserling, 1891) – Brazil
Wulfilopsis leopoldina Brescovit, 1997 – Brazil
Wulfilopsis martinsi Brescovit, 1997 – Brazil
Wulfilopsis pygmaea (Keyserling, 1891) – Brazil
Wulfilopsis tenuipes (Keyserling, 1891) – Brazil
Wulfilopsis tripunctata (Mello-Leitão, 1947) – Brazil

References

Anyphaenidae
Araneomorphae genera
Spiders of Brazil